Viscardi is a surname. Notable people with the surname include:

Chris Viscardi, American screenwriter. See Will McRobb and Chris Viscardi
Davide Viscardi (born 1990), Italian male short track speed skater
Giovanni Antonio Viscardi (1645–1713), Swiss Baroque architect
Henry Viscardi Jr. (1912-2004), American disability rights advocate
Michael Viscardi (born 1989), American mathematician
Viscardi Andrade Guimarães (born 1984), Brazilian mixed martial artist

See also
Henry Viscardi School, special school in the United States